Monnina chimborazeana is a species of plant in the family Polygalaceae. It is endemic to Ecuador.

References

chomborazeana
Flora of Ecuador
Near threatened plants
Taxonomy articles created by Polbot
Plants described in 1896